Landon Young (born August 21, 1997) is an American football offensive tackle for the New Orleans Saints of the National Football League (NFL). He played college football at Kentucky and was drafted by the Saints in the sixth round of the 2021 NFL Draft.

College career

Young was ranked as a fivestar recruit by 247Sports.com coming out of Lafayette High School in Lexington, Kentucky. He committed to Kentucky on June 14, 2013. Young would become a captain his senior year of high school for his football team.

Professional career

Young was drafted by the New Orleans Saints with the 206th pick in the sixth round of the 2021 NFL Draft on May 1, 2021. He signed his four-year rookie contract with New Orleans on June 8, 2021. He was placed on injured reserve on November 23, 2021.

References

External links
Kentucky bio

Living people
New Orleans Saints players
Players of American football from Lexington, Kentucky
American football offensive tackles
Kentucky Wildcats football players
1997 births